Craig Cheffins is a former member of the Legislative Assembly of Alberta for the Calgary-Elbow riding. Running as a Liberal, he won the seat in a 2007 by-election, but lost the seat in the 2008 general election.

Political life
A by-election was called to replace former premier Ralph Klein, who vacated the seat, after retiring as premier of Alberta.
He was considered a "prime candidate" in the by-election, according to Don Braid, of the Calgary Herald., and won the by-election by approximately 800 votes.  The constituency had previously elected Progressive Conservative candidates in every election and by-election since 1971.

Previously Cheffins was the president of the Calgary community of Lakeview and involved in the West Hillhurst community associations.  He was also active in prior Liberal party campaigns.

Cheffins was an active member of the Weaselhead Preservation Society.

Cheffins lost the provincial election on March 3, 2008.

On September 11, 2008 Craig Cheffins announced he was supporting Dave Taylor for the leadership of the Alberta Liberal Party, and would be taking on the role of Campaign Co-Chair for that effort.

Election results

Career
Cheffins' employer at the time of the 2007 by-election was Mount Royal College (MRC), where he was the Work Experience Coordinator of the Justice Studies department.

References

External links

Year of birth missing (living people)
Living people
Politicians from Calgary
Alberta Liberal Party MLAs
21st-century Canadian politicians